Star Blanket 83C is an Indian reserve of the Star Blanket Cree Nation in Saskatchewan. It is 18 kilometres northeast of Lipton. In the 2016 Canadian Census, it recorded a population of 0 living in 1 of its 1 total private dwellings.

References

Indian reserves in Saskatchewan
Division No. 6, Saskatchewan
Star Blanket Cree Nation